The 22nd International 500-Mile Sweepstakes Race was held at the Indianapolis Motor Speedway on May 30, 1934. The winner was the number seven car driven by Bill Cummings, an Indianapolis native, at an average speed of 104.863 miles per hour. Cummings led for 57 laps total, including the last 26. Of the 33 cars that began the race, only 12 were running at the finish, although there were no crashes resulting in serious injuries. One serious incident involved George Bailey, whose car went over the outside wall, but resulted in only a broken wrist to the driver. The finish was the closest in the history of the race to that point, with second-place finisher Mauri Rose within 100 yards of Cummings at the finish (officially 27.25 seconds behind). Rose would also file a protest that Cummings had illegally gained ground during a "slow-down" period following a crash.

Cummings was accompanied by riding mechanic Earl Unversaw. The race was part of the 1934 AAA Championship Car season.

Time trials
Ten-lap (25 mile) qualifying runs were utilized. Kelly Petillo earned the pole position with a speed of over 119 mph.

During a qualification attempt, driver Peter Kreis lost control in turn 1, climbed over the wall, and struck a tree outside of the track. He and his riding mechanic were fatally injured.

Race summary and results

At the start, polesitter Petillo took the lead for the first 4 laps. But the pace was 8 mph off the record of the previous year, owing to new fuel regulations that limited cars to 45 gallons for the entire race. By half-distance, Mauri Rose was leading, but close behind him was Cummings. "Wild Bill" first assumed the lead at 325 miles as Rose pitted for fuel, then lost it as he too made a stop. Cummings then closed on Rose and passed him with 70 miles to go. Both drivers, confident that they had enough fuel, then upped their pace to reach 140 mph on the straights. Cummings and Rose were never more than 30 seconds apart in the last part of the race. Cummings took the checkered with a new record average speed, despite the new fuel limitations. Rose was 2nd, 27 seconds behind.

Alternates
First alternate: Willard Prentiss

Failed to Qualify

Bill Chittum  (#59)
Maynard Clark  (#56)
George Connor  (#39)
Wesley Crawford (#44)
Danny Day  (#62)
Pete DePaolo (#27) - Withdrew
Leon Duray (#54)
Fred Frame (#34)
Sam Hoffman  (#47)
Ted Horn  (#53)
Harry Hunt  (#43)
Peter Kreis (#14) - Fatal accident
Harry Lewis  (#52)
Tee Linn  (#62)
Milt Marion  (#57)
Vern Ornduff  (#62)
Jack Petticord (#52)
Harold Shaw  (#65) - Driver refused
Orville Smith  (#61) - Driver rejected
Babe Stapp (#44, #54)
Al Theisen  (#53)
Charles Tramison  (#72)
Bob Wallace  (#53)
Doc Williams  (#38) - Driver rejected

Race details
For 1934, riding mechanics were required.

After several consecutive 500s with multiple fatalities, new rules limited all cars to 45 gallons of fuel for the entire race. This was meant to limit speeds in the race as drivers would have to drive more conservatively or use up all their fuel before the finish. Despite predictions, new average speed records were set.

References

Indianapolis 500 races
Indianapolis 500
Indianapolis 500
1934 in American motorsport